Jack Pack is the eponymous debut studio album by English vocal group Jack Pack. It was released on 30 September 2015 by Syco Music. The album contains cover songs and three original tracks, including the lead single "Say You Love Me". Jack Pack finished in fourth place on the eighth series of Britain's Got Talent.  On 8 September 2015, it was announced that the group had signed with Syco Music.

Track listing

Charts

References

2015 debut albums
Covers albums
Syco Music albums